Lamont Mack (born March 16, 1987) is an American professional basketball player who last played for the Dinamo Tbilisi.

College career
At Angelina College in Lufkin, Texas, he was a Junior College all-American and ranked as the 21st best player in junior college. Mack played for the Charlotte 49ers while studying a criminal justice major from 2007 to 2009. In his first season, he had an average of 15.6 points per game, improving greatly in the second half of the season to become a "bona fide scorer". He is a fan of the Chicago Bulls and Chicago White Sox and would have played baseball had he not made a career in basketball. He cites his grandmother, Nelgie Jordan, as his greatest influence.

Professional career
Mack joined the Greek League team AEK Athens in 2009, and in January 2011, he signed with PBC Lukoil Academic in Bulgaria. He spent the 2012–13 season with Scavolini Pesaro in Italy, then in July 2013, he signed with s.Oliver Baskets of the German Basketball Bundesliga. He parted ways with them in December 2013.

In February 2014, he signed with Korihait of Finland, leaving a month later to sign with CB Valladolid in Spain.

In August 2014, Mack signed with Club La Unión in Argentina. In October 2014, he parted ways with La Unión. On January 9, 2015, he signed with Gigantes Edomex Toluca of the Mexican LNBP. He left Gigantes after only four games. On February 27, 2015, he signed with CS Energia Rovinari of the Romanian Liga Națională for the rest of the season. On August 24, 2015, he re-signed with Energia. On February 23, 2016, he left Energia and signed with STB Le Havre of France for the rest of the 2015–16 LNB Pro A season.

On September 6, 2016, Mack signed with Macedonian club Karpoš Sokoli for the 2016–17 season. On October 9, 2016, he parted ways with Karpoš Sokoli after appearing in only three games. On October 19, 2016, he signed with Hoops Club of the Lebanese Basketball League.

On September 5, 2017, Mack signed with Timba Timișoara, but he did not pass a medical test. In October 2017, he joined the Iowa Wolves in the NBA G League.

References

External links

ESPN.com profile
Charlotte 49ers bio
Eurobasket.com profile
FIBA.com profile

1987 births
Living people
AEK B.C. players
American expatriate basketball people in Argentina
American expatriate basketball people in Bulgaria
American expatriate basketball people in Finland
American expatriate basketball people in France
American expatriate basketball people in Germany
American expatriate basketball people in Greece
American expatriate basketball people in Italy
American expatriate basketball people in Lebanon
American expatriate basketball people in North Macedonia
American expatriate basketball people in Mexico
American expatriate basketball people in Romania
American expatriate basketball people in Spain
American men's basketball players
Angelina Roadrunners men's basketball players
Basketball players from Chicago
Basketball players from Saint Paul, Minnesota
CB Valladolid players
Charlotte 49ers men's basketball players
Gigantes del Estado de México players
Greek Basket League players
Liga ACB players
PBC Academic players
Small forwards
S.Oliver Würzburg players
STB Le Havre players
Victoria Libertas Pallacanestro players